is a Japanese hip hop recording artist, DJ and record producer who debuted in 1997 as a record producer of the hip hop group M-Flo. The group rose to prominence in the early 2000s, with hit singles such as "How You Like Me Now?" and "Come Again." Takahashi was also a member of Avex's 20th anniversary dance music project Ravex, and has produced songs for musicians such as Crystal Kay, Ami Suzuki and Rie Fu, and remixes for Hikaru Utada and Ayumi Hamasaki. He formed the record labels Tachytelic Records and TCY Recording.

Taku Takahashi has occasionally rapped in his songs, such as on M-Flo's songs "Get On!" and "The Rhyme Brokers," and occasionally sung vocals ("I Wanna Be Down," "Love Long and Prosper", "Toxic Sweet").

Biography

Taku Takahashi grew up in Yokohama, with his father employed in the construction industry. He attended high school in Tokyo, at St. Mary's International School, along with Verbal. In 1992, the pair formed a rap rock band called N.M.D. in 1992, in which Takahashi wrote the music and performed the drums. The band received many offers from major record labels after their live performances, however as Verbal did not see being a rapper as a practical career, these offers were turned down. The pair went their separate ways after high school, with Takahashi travelling to Beverly Hills, Los Angeles in 1994, attending Occidental College, and Verbal to Boston. Takahashi tried majoring in physics, philosophy and Asian Studies with little success. He enrolled in a local music school, beginning his career as a DJ and songwriter.

Takahashi returned to Japan in the mid 1990s, and formed a musical unit with a female vocalist, called Love Soul. After sending a demo tape of this group to Artimage management, Takahashi met Masaji Asakawa from the DJ group GTS. Takahashi began producing music full-time, and in 1998 recorded a cover of Barbra Streisand's "The Way We Were" with Verbal when he returned to Japan for winter break. This song, followed by "Been So Long," featuring vocals from Lisa, was well received by Asakawa, leading the trio to form the group M-Flo, officially debuting in 1999. The group's first release, "The Tripod E.P.," debuted in the top 10 on the Japanese singles chart. The group achieved great success in 2000 and 2001 with the songs "How You Like Me Now?" and "Come Again," with the former selling more than 220,000 copies, and the latter approximately 390,000 copies. The band's second album, Expo Expo, debuted at #4 on the charts.

In 2002, Lisa left M-Flo to follow a solo career, causing the band to begin releasing albums with a variety of famous vocalists. This led to Takahashi working on collaborations with a variety of artists. His first notable produced singles were Crystal Kay's "Hard to Say" and "Boyfriend (Part II)" in 2002/2003. At the same time, he created a production label, Tachytelic Records. An audition was held to find vocalists for Takahashi to produce, with the grand winner being songwriter Emi Hinouchi. Between 2002 and 2003, the label produced six releases: Emi Hinouchi's first four singles and debut album, along with a DJ mix tape created by Takahashi called Tachytelic Night: Welcomes You to the Far East. However, none of the releases were successful, with all of the releases charting under the #100 mark on Oricon charts. The label continued to promote events, such as the regular Tachytelic Night DJ set events, and Takahashi produced the Pro Evolution Soccer 6 theme song, Ukatrats FC's "Win and Shine." However, after 2006 the label ceased to exist.

Takahashi continued working full-time with M-Flo until mid 2007, when the tour for the group's fifth album Cosmicolor finished and M-Flo ceased regular activities. Since then, the group released a string of compilation albums, such as greatest hit albums and outside collaborative work compilation albums. Takahashi has regularly produced songs and remixes for musicians, including several Western artists (Calvin Harris, Lady Sovereign, The Ting Tings). He has participated in many DJ events, including his self-produced Orthosync events, and many House Nation events. In 2008, Takahashi became a member of Ravex, a three DJ group formed for the 20th anniversary of the Avex music group. The group's resulting 2009 album, Trax, was much like M-Flo's later albums, featuring a collection of vocalists from across Avex record labels.

In 2010, Taku Takahashi launched his second record label, TCY Recording, featuring dance music artists such as TeddyLoid and Hoshina Anniversary. He found most of them on MySpace music. He also began working as a music director, for the Gainax animated series Panty & Stocking with Garterbelt, which began airing in October 2010.

In 2011, Taku Takahashi filled in for Kissy Sellout's radio show on BBC Radio 1 as part of "Jaguar Skills and His Amazing Friends." His ten-minute mix included remixes of songs from his time with m-flo and the Godzilla theme.

Discography

Albums

Produced singles

Other appearances

Below are songs featuring input from Takahashi away from M-Flo (i.e. without Verbal, or without Lisa circa 1998—2002).

References

External links
 Official MySpace 
 Official Twitter 
 Official YouTube channel
 Artimage management label site 
 Tachytelic Records official website 

1974 births
Avex Group people
Electronic dance music DJs
Japanese DJs
Japanese electronic musicians
Japanese hip hop musicians
Japanese record producers
Living people
M-Flo members
Musicians from Kanagawa Prefecture
Musicians from Yokohama
Ravex members